Rushey Mead Academy, previously known as Rushey Mead School, is a mixed secondary school located in Leicester, Leicestershire, England for students aged 11 to 16. It is part of The Mead Educational Trust which also includes Orchard Mead Academy. It was named as the best state-funded secondary school in Leicester and Leicestershire in 2018.

Academic achievement
In its November 2007 Ofsted report, the school was rated "outstanding" for overall effectiveness. In 2009, Ofsted highlighted it as one of 12 outstanding schools serving disadvantaged communities.

The Real Schools Guide 2018 named Rushey Mead Academy the best state-funded secondary school in Leicester and Leicestershire.

Notable former pupils
 Jigar Naik — Leicestershire cricketer
 Tony Sibson — boxer
 Mark Morrison — R&B singer
 Chris Pyatt — boxer, former world middleweight champion

References

External links
 School homepage

In the News
 BBC Leicester | Your Stories | Pupils visit earthquake hit area
 ITV News | GCSE results day - 54 A and A* grades for twins / Two sets of twins earn 39 A*-As at a Leicester school

Secondary schools in Leicester
Academies in Leicester